Ellen Breen  (born 17 April 1963) is an American freestyle skier and world champion.

She competed at the FIS Freestyle World Ski Championships 1986 in Tignes, where she placed fifth in acroski (ski ballet). She won a gold medal in ski ballet at the FIS Freestyle World Ski Championships 1991 in Lake Placid. She won a second gold medal in ski ballet at the FIS Freestyle World Ski Championships 1993 in Altenmarkt-Zauchensee. At the FIS Freestyle World Ski Championships 1995 in La Clusaz she won a silver medal.

She took part at the 1992 Winter Olympics in Albertville, where ski ballet was a demonstration event.

References

External links 
 

1963 births
Living people
American female freestyle skiers
21st-century American women